This is a list of events in Scottish television from 1964.

Events
20 April – BBC 2 Scotland starts broadcasting; the existing BBC channel is renamed BBC 1 Scotland. A power failure prevents the planned opening night's schedule from happening, meaning the first programme shown is Play School the following morning.
30 April – Television sets manufactured as of this date are required to receive UHF channels.
 15 August – Scottish launches Scotsport Results to provide Scottish viewers with a round-up of the day's Scottish football. It is broadcast on Saturday teatimes, at around 5 pm during the football season.
15 October – Television coverage of the general election.
15 December – Peter Watkins' docudrama Culloden is shown nationally on BBC TV.

Television series
Scotsport (1957–2008)
The White Heather Club (1958–1968)
Dr. Finlay's Casebook (1962–1971)
The Adventures of Francie and Josie (1962–1970)

Births

13 May - Lorraine McIntosh, singer and actress
6 September - Stephen Greenhorn, playwright, television writer and novelist
Unknown - Paul Higgins, actor

See also
1964 in Scotland

References

 
Television in Scotland by year
1960s in Scottish television